Ramón Covarrubias Garza (born December 8, 1945), known by his stage name Ramón Ayala, is a Mexican singer, composer and songwriter of Norteño music.

Discography
Studio albums (Ramón Ayala Y Sus Bravos Del Norte)
 La Pura Maña (1971)
 Estrenos (1971)
 Ojitos Soñadores (1972)
 Corazón vagabundo (1973)
 Por Que?? (1973)
 Lindo Tampico (1973)
 El Amor Que Me Falta (1974)
 Amor Eterno (1974)
 Cumbias! Cumbias! Cumbias! (1974)
 Contrabando Y Traicion (1975)
 Consuelo (1976)
 El Triunfador (1977)
 El Soldado Raso (1978)
 Mi Piquito De Oro (1978)
 Dos Hojas Sin Rumbo (1979)
 Pistoleros Famosos (1980)
 Con Las Puertas En La Cara (1981)
 En Amo De La Musica Norteña (1983)
 El Corrido del Tuerto (1984)
 Corridos Norteños (1985)
 15 Aniversario (1986)
 Damelo (1987)
 La Rama De Mezquite (1989)
 Chiflando En La Loma (1993)
 Dime Cuando Volveras (1994)
 Casas De Madera (1998)
 Quémame Los Ojos (2000)
 Cruzando Fronteras (2007)

References

Notes

Bibliography

External links
 Ramón Ayala website
 MusicWorld biography
 Ramon Ayala Biography

1945 births
Grammy Award winners
Latin Grammy Award winners
Living people
Mexican accordionists
Mexican male songwriters
Musicians from Monterrey
Norteño musicians
21st-century accordionists
21st-century Mexican male singers